Stetinden is a mountain on the border of Luster Municipality in Vestland county and Lom Municipality in Innlandet county, Norway. The mountain is surrounded by several other notable mountains including Kyrkja, Kyrkjeoksli, and Høgvagltindene to the southeast; Surtningstinden, Gravdalstinden, and Søre Smørstabbtindan to the southwest; Storebjørn and Veslebjørn to the west; Smørstabbtindene, Sokse, and Kniven to the northwest; Rundhøi and Sauhøi to the north; Tverrbottindene to the northeast; and Tverrbytthornet to the east.

See also
List of mountains of Norway by height

References

Jotunheimen
Lom, Norway
Luster, Norway
Mountains of Vestland
Mountains of Innlandet